American actress Shannen Doherty has appeared in numerous television programs and motion pictures. After her television debut in Father Murphy in 1981, she landed her first major role in the dramatic western television series Little House on the Prairie (1982–1983), and reprised her role in its three television specials. Doherty received two Young Artist Award nominations for playing the oldest Witherspoon sibling Kris in the family drama Our House (1986–1988). She appeared in four films during the 1980s, including the positively-received, animated film The Secret of NIMH (1982) and the cult classic Heathers (1988). Her breakthrough role was as Brenda Walsh in the teen drama Beverly Hills, 90210 (1990–1994), but she was later dropped from the series because of backstage issues and her negative image as a "bad girl". She starred in television films in the early and mid-1990s, and played Rene Mosier in the romantic comedy Mallrats (1995) in an attempt to rebuild her career.

Doherty enjoyed a resurgence in popularity after being cast by producer Aaron Spelling to play Prue Halliwell on the supernatural drama Charmed (1998–2001). The series was their second collaboration following Beverly Hills, 90210. The character was praised by critics and fans, earning a spot as one of the best witches in television history according to a TVLine article, and Doherty took an active role in the show's production, directing three of its episodes. Following disagreements with Spelling and co-star Alyssa Milano, Doherty left the series in its third season. Doherty starred in a string of television films and had a recurring role on the prime-time soap opera North Shore (2004–2005). The following year, she was cast as Denise Johnson in the unaired pilot of the sitcom Love, Inc., but was dropped from the show by producers from United Paramount Network (UPN).  She reprised her role as Brenda Walsh in the reboot of 90210 (2008–2009), appearing as a special guest star in seven episodes in its first season.

While acting in scripted material, Doherty also participated in five reality television shows, none of which had much success, except Shannen Says (2012), in which she received positive reviews. In 2010, Doherty competed in the tenth season of Dancing with the Stars to honor her father who had a stroke in December 2009. Later that year, she also voiced the identical twins Mari and Kari on the animated web series Mari-Kari, and starred in the independent satirical thriller Burning Palms after a nine-year absence from film. In 2012 and 2014, she directed two music videos for the band Radical Something. She starred alongside Alec Baldwin, Danny Glover, and Michael Madsen in the 2016 sports drama film Back in the Day. In 2018, she appeared in a television series based on Heathers and the television movie No One Would Tell, a remake of the 1996 film of the same name. The following year, she portrayed a heightened version of herself for BH90210, and guest-starred on Riverdale as part of a Luke Perry tribute. Doherty appeared in two action films Fortress (2021) and Hot Seat (2022), as well as two television films, Dying to Belong and List of a Lifetime, in 2021

Film

Television

Web

Music video appearances

References

Citations

Bibliography

External links 
 

Actress filmographies
American filmographies
Director filmographies